Sam Soliman (born 13 November 1973) is an Australian professional boxer, and former kickboxer and mixed martial artist. In boxing, he held the IBF middleweight title in 2014.

Kickboxing career
Soliman is a former world champion in kickboxing, and also competed in Muay Thai.

Professional boxing career
On 20 April 1997, Soliman made his professional boxing debut, defeating Heath Stenton by four-round unanimous decision (UD). In the first half of his career he won a multitude of regional titles, from light-middleweight to cruiserweight. Most notably he won the vacant Commonwealth middleweight title on 19 June 2000, scoring a ninth-round stoppage over Neville Brown. This reign was short-lived, as Soliman would lose a points decision to Howard Eastman a few months later on 16 September. His first world championship opportunity came on 7 March 2007, against Anthony Mundine for the vacant WBA super-middleweight title in an all-Australian showdown. After four knockdowns, Soliman lost by knockout in round nine. In a rematch on 28 May 2008, this time with Mundine as defending champion, Soliman lost by UD.

The pinnacle of Soliman's career was on 31 May 2014, when he defeated multiple-time world champion Felix Sturm by UD to win the IBF middleweight title. They had previously fought on 1 February 2013, which was a fight marred afterwards by a drawn-out legal battle which took more than three years to resolve. Soliman was first announced to have failed a drug test in April 2013, which resulted in the German Boxing Federation ruling the fight a no contest and handing him a nine-month suspension in Germany. In October 2016, Soliman was exonerated by a German court which judged the Federation to have acted unlawfully, thus overturning the no contest result. However, in yet another short-lived championship reign, Soliman lost by UD to former undisputed middleweight champion Jermain Taylor on 8 October 2014, enduring four knockdowns due to a debilitating knee injury.

Outside of boxing
Soliman has worked with people in need, and closely with the Salvation Army. He has set up a gym and spends twice a week teaching fitness and wellbeing to homeless people. In 1996, he competed as a contestant on season three of Australian Gladiators.

Professional boxing record

References

External links

Egyptian male boxers
Australian people of Coptic descent
Australian people of Egyptian descent
Super-middleweight boxers
Doping cases in boxing
1973 births
Living people
The Contender (TV series) participants
Boxers from Melbourne
Australian male boxers
Commonwealth Boxing Council champions
International Boxing Federation champions
Light-middleweight boxers
Light-heavyweight boxers
Cruiserweight boxers
World middleweight boxing champions
Australian male kickboxers
Australian Muay Thai practitioners